Muntadgin is a townsite off the Great Eastern Highway on Brissenden Road, situated between the towns of Bruce Rock and Southern Cross in the Wheatbelt region of Western Australia. At the 2016 census, Muntadgin had a population of 51.

Originating as a railway siding on the Narembeen to Merredin line, the location was thought by the district surveyor to be ideal for a townsite. The townsite was surveyed and gazetted in 1925.

A hotel licence was granted in 1931 to Colin Geoffrey Elliott to run the hotel that had recently been constructed in the town.

The name is Aboriginal in origin and is taken from the nearby Muntadgin Soak, which first appeared on maps of the area in 1912.

Currently the town still has a wheat siding, the Muntadgin hotel that provides meals and accommodation, and recreation facilities, including a golf course. The town celebrated its 75th anniversary in 2005. The surrounding areas produce wheat and other cereal crops. The town is a receival site for Cooperative Bulk Handling.

References

Towns in Western Australia
Grain receival points of Western Australia
Shire of Merredin